"Bim bam toi" (English: Bim bam you) is a song by Carla that served as France's entry in the Junior Eurovision Song Contest 2019, held in Gliwice, Poland, on 24 November 2019. It was released on the MCA label as a single on 11 October.

In December 2019, the song went viral on TikTok and climbed to number one on the Spotify Top 50 Viral chart for France.

Background 
"Bim bam toi" is an electropop song performed in French, the national language, with a few words in English. It tells the story of love at first sight. Carla sings:

With the chorus:

During the Junior Eurovision Song Contest 2019, it was the second song performed, after "We Will Rise" by Jordan Anthony (Australia) and just before "A Time for Us" by Tatiana Mezhentseva and Denberel Oorjak (Russia). Having obtained 85 points from the juries (sixth place) and 84 from the televoting (third place), Carla finished fifth with a total of 169 points.

As early as November, TikTok users were participating in the "Bim bam toi" challenge by uploading videos of themselves lip-syncing to the song. This went viral in France when Juju Fitcats, a YouTube fitness vlogger with more than a million followers, participated in the challenge in early December. In her video, Fitcats cheerfully sings the song while dancing in an airplane just before takeoff.  It has garnered millions of views and has been parodied many times.

The song spent a couple of weeks at number one on the Spotify Top 50 Viral chart for France and continued to trend in the top three well into January.

Since February 2020, the official music video for "Bim bam toi" is the most-watched Junior Eurovision-related video on YouTube. The track also appeared as a Fortnite emote in October 2021.

Track listing

Charts

Certifications

References 

Electropop songs
French pop songs
2019 songs
2019 singles
Junior Eurovision songs
Songs written by Barbara Pravi